Janky Promoters is a 2009 American comedy film, starring Ice Cube and Mike Epps who play as "janky" promoters who book rapper Jeezy to play at their concert, only to fail at doing it the right way and thus getting into more trouble than they bargained for.

Plot

The film begins with a flash forward to a later scene in the movie in which Russell Redds (Cube) and Jellyroll (Epps) are running out of a concert being chased by an angry mob as they drive off in Russell's car. The plot starts off with Russell coming home late and sneaking into his wife's purse to get her checkbook. He then hears her wake up and pretends to sleep only to be caught by his wife who already knows what happened. This indicates that Russell does not have all the money for the concert yet.

Meanwhile, his co-partner Jellyroll is fooling around with another man's wife at a hotel only to be encountered by a television show's crew (a cameo appearance by Joey Greco) who hunts down people who cheat on their loved ones. Suddenly Gina's husband Ronnie, who is a cop, drives into the parking lot and starts to shoot at them from his cop car as Jellyroll and Gina escape by car.

Russell visits his mom and begs for money but is turned down and is forced to steal his wife's checkbook while she is in the shower. He checks up on his son, who goes by Yung Semore, and makes sure he is ready to open up for Young Jeezy to perform at the concert. He continues his plans by picking up Jellyroll and getting a rent-a-van to pick up Young Jeezy instead of getting a limo. He gets Jellyroll to pick them up from the airport as he runs errands around Modesto, California getting more money or getting hotel reservations for the rapper and his entourage.

After taking forever to arrive at the airport, Jellyroll finally shows up and picks the rapper up at the airport. He finds out that Jeezy wants some weed badly, so he decides to take them to the hood to get some. He meets up with his drug dealer Mondo who scolds him for getting weed for the rapper and asks if Jeezy can come to his after party. Jellyroll insists that the rapper wants $20,000 to show up and Mondo accepts and gives him the money. This is where things start to turn for the promoters as Jellyroll spends the $20,000 on clothes and jewelry instead of using it for the show to pay Jeezy his money. From there, the movie turns wild and intense as Russell and Jellyroll try to figure out a way to get Jeezy to perform while dodging Mondo and his crew and getting the money to pay Jeezy to perform.

Cast
 Ice Cube as Russell Redds
 Mike Epps as Jellyroll
 Young Jeezy as himself
 Lahmard Tate as Young Percy
 Darris Love as Mondo
 Lil' JJ as Seymour "Yung Semore" Redds
 Julio Oscar Mechoso as John Glanville
 Glenn Plummer as Officer Ronnie Stixx
 Juanita Jennings as Momma
 Aloma Wright as Ms. Ann
 Jowharah Jones as Loli
 Joey Greco as Kevin MaLine
 Tamala Jones as Regina Stixx
 Leland White as KK
 Malik Barnhardt as C W
 Tiffany Haddish as Michelle
 Kerisse Hutchinson as Lisa
 Reghan Alexander as Valerie

Release
After being delayed several times, the film released to a limited release on October 16, 2009. The film's DVD was released on November 24, 2009, and also made available for purchase on iTunes in HD and Standard Definition on February 10, 2010.

In an interview, star Ice Cube stated that the film was unfinished, and that the DVD release was made without his knowledge while he was working on a deal for a wider release of the film.

References

External links
 
 
 

2009 films
2000s buddy comedy films
American buddy comedy films
African-American films
Cube Vision films
Dimension Films films
Films scored by John Murphy (composer)
Films directed by Marcus Raboy
Films produced by Ice Cube
Films set in California
Films shot in California
Films shot in Los Angeles
2000s hip hop films
Hood comedy films
Films with screenplays by Ice Cube
2009 comedy films
2000s English-language films
2000s American films